Kaiqiao Green Area is a park in Shanghai, China.

References

External links
 

Parks in Shanghai
Changning District